A refractive index profile is the distribution of refractive indices of materials within an optical fiber.  Some optical fiber has a step-index profile, in which the core has one uniformly-distributed index and the cladding has a lower uniformly-distributed index.  Other optical fiber has a graded-index profile, in which the refractive index varies gradually as a function of radial distance from the fiber center.  Graded-index profiles include power-law index profiles and parabolic index profiles.

Optical fiber
Refraction